Jonathan Edward Bernthal  (born September 20, 1976) is an American actor. 

Beginning his career in the early 2000s, he came to prominence for portraying Shane Walsh on the AMC horror series The Walking Dead (2010–2012; 2018), where he was a starring cast member in the first two seasons. Bernthal achieved further recognition as Frank Castle / The Punisher in the Marvel Cinematic Universe (MCU). Originating the role in the 2016 second season of the Netflix action series Daredevil, he headlined an eponymous series from 2017 to 2019, and will reprise the role in the forthcoming Disney+ series Daredevil: Born Again (2024). Bernthal's likeness was also used for the character in the Marvel Comics series The Punisher: War Machine (2017) and an ongoing Punisher comic book series. 

His film roles include Snitch (2013), The Wolf of Wall Street (2013), Fury (2014), Sicario (2015), The Accountant (2016), Baby Driver (2017), Wind River (2017), Widows (2018), Ford v Ferrari (2019);  Those Who Wish Me Dead, King Richard, and The Many Saints of Newark (all 2021).

Early life 
Jonathan Edward Bernthal was born in Washington, D.C. on September 20, 1976, to a Jewish family. He is the son of Joan Lurie (née Marx) and Eric Lawrence "Rick" Bernthal, a former lawyer with Latham & Watkins LLP and chair of the board of directors for The Humane Society of the United States until 2019. His paternal grandfather was musician and producer Murray Bernthal (1911–2010). He has two brothers: Nicholas, an orthopedic surgeon and professor at UCLA, and Thomas, a consulting agency CEO who is married to billionaire and former Facebook COO Sheryl Sandberg. His cousin was rock musician Adam Schlesinger (1967-2020).

Bernthal grew up in Cabin John, Maryland. He attended the Sidwell Friends School, graduating in 1995. He has often described his younger self as a "troublemaker". After high school, he studied at Skidmore College in Saratoga Springs, New York, but dropped out. On the advice of his acting teacher, Alma Becker, he joined the Moscow Art Theatre School in Russia. During his time there, he was a catcher for a Russian professional baseball team.

Career

2002–2009: Early career 
Bernthal was discovered while at the Moscow Art Theatre by the executive director of Harvard University's Institute for Advanced Theater Training at the American Repertory Theater in Cambridge, Massachusetts; he studied there as a graduate-level certificate student and completed his studies in 2002. After graduating he moved to New York City to pursue a career in theater. He is a method actor.

Since 2002, Bernthal has performed in over thirty plays regionally and Off-Broadway, including many with his own award-winning theater company, the now defunct Fovea Floods. He also had small guest roles in television series, such as Boston Legal, CSI: Miami and How I Met Your Mother.

Bernthal relocated to Los Angeles in 2006. He booked his first regular role on a television series with the CBS sitcom The Class; the show was canceled after one season. He had roles in films, such as Day Zero and World Trade Center.

2009–2015: Breakthrough

Television and The Walking Dead: 2009–2013 
In 2009, Bernthal was a series regular on the ABC television series Eastwick, and starred alongside actress Jaime Ray Newman (his future co-star in The Punisher); Eastwick was canceled after one season. In 2010, Bernthal portrayed Sgt. Manuel Rodriguez on the HBO miniseries The Pacific.

Bernthal found critical success portraying Shane Walsh in Frank Darabont's The Walking Dead, based on the comic book series of the same name. He was a regular on the show until 2012 and was nominated for the Breakout Performance – Male Award at the 2011 Scream Awards. Bernthal reunited with Darabont for the TNT series Mob City, in which he played LAPD Detective Joe Teague, a police officer working in a corrupt 1940s Los Angeles, which was cancelled after one season.

During this period, Bernthal had supporting roles in the 2009 fantasy film Night at the Museum: Battle of the Smithsonian as mobster Al Capone and Roman Polanski's thriller film The Ghost Writer. He also appeared in the 2011 Woody Harrelson feature Rampart. He guest starred in episodes of television shows such as Numbers and Harry's Law. In 2011, Bernthal performed in the premiere of the dark comedy play Small Engine Repair. The play was critically acclaimed; critics praised Bernthal's performance for his "energy and wit" and he was nominated for an Ovation Award. After its world premiere run Small Engine Repair was transferred Off-Broadway by MCC Theater with Bernthal signing on to reprise his role. However, filming commitments made Bernthal withdraw from the play and he was replaced by James Badge Dale.

Film: 2013–2015 

In 2013, Bernthal had supporting roles in the crime drama film Snitch, and the sports comedy film Grudge Match. Bernthal played Brad in the Martin Scorsese film The Wolf of Wall Street. He played southerner Grady "Coon-Ass" Travis in the 2014 World War II film Fury, with critics praising the cast of the film. In 2014, Bernthal took part in filming the movie Viena and the Fantomes, opposite Dakota Fanning and Evan Rachel Wood; the film was only released in 2020.

Bernthal next appeared in Denis Villeneuve's 2015 action drama film Sicario, which won numerous awards and received positive reviews from critics. 2015 also saw Bernthal in supporting roles in Me and Earl and the Dying Girl, winner of the US Grand Jury Prize for drama at the 2015 Sundance Film Festival, and We Are Your Friends.

During this time, Bernthal portrayed NAACP attorney Michael H. Sussman in the HBO miniseries Show Me a Hero. He also, alongside actor Viggo Mortensen, executive produced the play The Time of Our Lies – The Life and Times of Howard Zinn, directed by frequent theater collaborator Josh Chambers. The Time of Our Lies was performed through the month of August 2014 at the Edinburgh Fringe Festival.

2015–2021: Prominence in television and film

Marvel and The Punisher: 2015–2019 
In June 2015, Marvel announced that Bernthal would play Frank Castle / The Punisher in season two of Netflix's superhero series Daredevil, which was released on March 18, 2016. While initially hesitant in joining a superhero franchise, Bernthal decided to take the role after admiring the performances of actors Charlie Cox (Matt Murdock / Daredevil) and Vincent D'Onofrio (Wilson Fisk) in the previous season of Daredevil. Critics commended Bernthal's performance as The Punisher, with IGN calling it "an absolutely stellar, gutting performance". Comic book writer and the Punisher's co-creator Gerry Conway called Bernthal's performance a favorite on-screen portrayal of the character and said, "Jon Bernthal gives The Punisher the kind of pathos that's underneath the tough guy and I really like that".

Despite not initially being ordered by Netflix, the network spun-off the character's self-titled series The Punisher, released on November 17, 2017. His portrayal of the title character in season one was commended as a "truly remarkable and intense performance" for its emotional depth and "possibly the best grizzly antihero performance among all of Marvel's Netflix series to date". Bernthal likes to perform his own stunts on the show. On December 12, 2017, it was announced that the show had been renewed for season two by Netflix, which was released on January 18, 2019. A month later, the show was canceled.

Work in film: 2015–2021 

In 2016, Bernthal co-starred in Ben Affleck's thriller film The Accountant as Brax. He also was interviewed for the documentary Can't Be Stopped about an American graffiti crew of the same name.

In 2017, he co-starred in Taylor Sheridan's directorial debut film Wind River, which premiered at the 2017 Sundance Film Festival. He also appeared in significant roles in Edgar Wright's Baby Driver as Griff and prison drama Shot Caller. In the Irish action thriller film Pilgrimage, Bernthal played The Mute. Due to the actor's preference to stay in character on film sets, he chose not to speak to the cast or crew for the first few weeks of production. Bernthal was praised for his acting, with The Hollywood Reporter remarking that Bernthal "steals the film with his intense, nearly wordless performance... with his buff physicality and commanding presence filling the screen".

On November 17, 2017, the initial season of The Punisher and the film Sweet Virginia were both released. For Sweet Virginia, Bernthal played a gentle motel-owner with Parkinson's disease and critics praised his performance. During the press tours at this time Bernthal's interview on Jim Norton and Sam Roberts made news due to his description of Kevin Spacey (who had faced recent sexual assault charges) of making him uncomfortable on the set of Baby Driver. Bernthal stated that he "lost all respect" for Spacey and that "[Spacey] was a bit of a bully." In the same month, Bernthal was offered a role for the 2018 biopic film First Man, but declined it due to his daughter's illness. In 2018, he appeared in Steve McQueen's heist thriller Widows, and reprised his role for the season 9 episode "What Comes After".

Bernthal played the brother of a fisherman (Shia LaBeouf) in the independent film The Peanut Butter Falcon. He played business magnate Lee Iacocca in a supporting role for James Mangold's action biographical drama Ford v Ferrari. Production began in the summer of 2018 and the film was released in November 2019. In summer 2019, Bernthal filmed Those Who Wish Me Dead, a western film directed by Taylor Sheridan. It was released in May 2021. In early 2019, Bernthal reprised his role in the film version of Small Engine Repair, a play in which he originated the role of Terrance Swaino in 2011. The film was released in September 2021. In January 2019, Bernthal joined the cast of The Many Saints of Newark, the prequel feature film of HBO's The Sopranos, which was released in October 2021. In the  Netflix film The Unforgivable, Bernthal played the love interest of a murderous woman (Sandra Bullock).

Work in games: 2017–2019 
Bernthal has also done work in the PC and console gaming world as a voice actor, and his appearance has been used for non-playable characters (NPCs). He appears in Tom Clancy's Ghost Recon Breakpoint as LT Cole D. Walker, and while he was featured in a trailer for Borderlands 3, a title released in 2019, he made no voice or likeness appearances in that game.

2022–present: Other ventures 
Bernthal starred as Baltimore Police Department Sergeant Wayne Jenkins in the HBO miniseries We Own This City. His new role is as the title character of the eight episode season of American Gigolo as Johnny and his gigolo alter ego "Julian". Bernthal played Mikey in the 2022 Hulu hit The Bear (TV series).

Podcasting: 2022–present 
On February 18, 2022, Real Ones with Jon Bernthal debuted, a podcast series developed by Bernthal that "gives the microphone to some of the most interesting, authentic people living on the front lines of the big issues of our time. From cops to gang members, soldiers and doctors, activists and first responders, you’re going to hear from people who aren’t pushing any agenda other than honest, open dialogue. What transpires is informative, funny, and at times heartbreaking – delivered by people you’ll feel an immediate connection to."

Upcoming projects 
It was announced in October 2018 that Bernthal has a role in the dark comedy movie Snow Ponies, notably an entry on the 2006 Black List; since the original casting announcement, the film has remained in development. Cast in October 2016, Bernthal will also star in the film Stingray opposite Joel Edgerton which has also remained in development. In March 2023, it was confirmed that Bernthal reprised his role as Frank Castle / The Punisher in Daredevil: Born Again, which is in development for Disney+.

Charity and advocacy 
Bernthal and his brother Nicholas run the nonprofit organization Drops Fill Buckets, described as an "impact-driven, entrepreneurial approach to making a difference".

Bernthal is also an advocate of pit bull ownership and is a spokesperson for the Animal Farm Foundation, which rescues and promotes the equal treatment of pit bulls. He has three pit bulls of his own who often accompany him to set; two of them, Boss and Venice, made appearances in his 2012 film Rampart.

Personal life 
Bernthal married trauma nurse Erin Angle, the niece of retired professional wrestler Kurt Angle, on September 25, 2010, in Potomac, Maryland.   They have three children together.  The family lives in Ojai, California. He is a fan of the Washington Commanders.

Filmography

Awards and nominations

References

External links 

 

1976 births
Living people
21st-century American male actors
American male film actors
American people of Romanian-Jewish descent
American male television actors
American male voice actors
Institute for Advanced Theater Training, Harvard University alumni
Jewish American male actors
Male actors from Washington, D.C.
Sidwell Friends School alumni
Skidmore College alumni
American male video game actors
People from Montgomery County, Maryland
21st-century American Jews